The GWF Brass Knuckles Championship was a professional wrestling championship. Similar to the WWF Hardcore Championship, it was defended only in hardcore matches in the Global Wrestling Federation. The title had two holders, Black Bart and Bill Irwin but was later retired.

Title history

Footnotes

References

External links
 Lineage at Solie's Title Histories

Hardcore wrestling championships
Global Wrestling Federation championships